Gemmobacter caeni is a Gram-negative, rod-shaped, non-spore-forming, strictly aerobic and motile bacterium from the genus of Gemmobacter which has been isolated from activated sludge from a butachlor waste water treatment system in Nantong in China.

References 

Rhodobacteraceae
Bacteria described in 2011